This is a list of parks and open spaces within the boundary of the London Borough of Croydon, England.

A

B

C

D

F

G

H

I

J

K

L

M

N

O

P

Q

R

S

T

U

W

See also
Croydon parks and open spaces
London LOOP

Notes

References

External links
Croydon Council - Parks and Open Spaces A-Z

 
Lists of places in London